GWR Records were an independent record label active in the UK from 1986 through to 1991.

By 1984, Gerry Bron's Bronze Records were in financial difficulty leading to a hiatus in recording activity for Motörhead. Eventually, Motörhead managers Douglas Smith and Dave Simmons bought the band out of their contract and Bron subsequently sold the Bronze Records rights onto Legacy Records owner Ray Richards.

Richards then contacted Smith with a proposal for a joint venture to release new product by Motörhead, leading to the formation of GWR Records (named after Smith's business address of 15 Great Western Road). In addition to Motörhead, the label mainly released product by acts associated with Smith, such as Girlschool, Fastway, Hawkwind, Tank, Atomgods and Anti-Nowhere League, and bands from the thrash metal scene.

By 1992, Smith had been ousted as a managing director of the company and the label's catalogue was absorbed into Castle Communications, which later became part of Sanctuary Records Group.

Albums
GWS1 – Hawkwind – Live Chronicles – 1986
GWRGBS1 – Various Artists – Bristol Custom Bike Show – 1986
GWLP1 – Motörhead – Orgasmatron – 1986
GWLP2 – Girlschool – Nightmare at Maple Cross – 1986
GWLP3 – Jon Mikl Thor – Recruits – Wild In the Streets – 1986
GWLP4 – Motörhead – Overkill – re-issue 1986
GWLP5 – Motörhead – Bomber – re-issue 1986
GWLP6 – Motörhead – Ace of Spades – re-issue 1986
GWLP7 – Motörhead – No Sleep 'til Hammersmith – re-issue 1986
GWLP8 – Wendy O. Williams – Maggots: The Record – licensed 1987
GWLP9 – Cro-Mags – The Age of Quarrel – licensed 1987
GWLP10 – Sword – Metalized – licensed 1987
GWLP11 –
GWLP12 – Anti-Nowhere League – Perfect Crime – 1987
GWLP13 – Tritonz – The Edge Of Hell – 1987
GWLP14 – Motörhead – Rock 'n' Roll – 1987
GWLP15 – Living Death - Protected from Reality - licensed 1987
GWLP16 – Holy Moses - Queen of Siam - licensed 1987
GWLP17 – Mekong Delta – Mekong Delta – licensed 1987
GWLP18 –
GWLP19 – Holy Moses - Finished with the Dogs - licensed 1987
GWLP20 – Last Descendants – One Nation Under God – licensed 1988
GWLP21 – Girlschool – Take a Bite – 1988
GWLP22 – Fastway – On Target – 1988
GWLP23 – Tank – Tank – 1988
GWLP24 – King Kurt – The Last Will & Testicle – 1988
GWLP25 – Mekong Delta – The Music of Erich Zann – licensed 1988
GWLP26 – Hawkwind – The Xenon Codex – 1988
GWLP27 – Lloyd Langton Group – Time Space and LLG – 1988
GWLP28 – Batfish – Batfish Brew – 1988
GWLP29 – Texas Instruments – Texas Instruments – 1988
GWLP30 – Atomgods – WOW! – 1988
GWLP31 – Motörhead – No Sleep at All – 1988
GWLP32 – Andrea Black - Andrea Black - 1988
GWLP33 – Deathwish – Demon Preacher – 1988
GWLP34 –
GWLP35 – Killer Dwarfs - Killer Dwarfs - licensed 1988
GWLP36 – Miss Daisy – Pizza Connection – 1989
GWLP37 – Elvis Hitler – Disgraceland – 1989
GWLP38 – The Pandoras - Rock Hard – licensed 1989
GWLP39 – The Vandals - Slippery When Ill - licensed 1989
GWLP41 – Mass – Take You Home – licensed 1989
GWLP42 – Num Skull – Ritually Abused – licensed 1989
GWLP43 – Social Distortion – Prison Bound – 1989
GWLP44 – Wasted Youth – Black Daze – licensed 1989
GWLP45 – Sword – Sweet Dreams – licensed 1989
GWLP46 – Pajama Slave Dancers - Blood, Sweat and Beers - licensed 1989
GWLP47 – Sacriliege BC – Too Cool to Pray – licensed 1989
GWLP48 – SGM – Aggression – licensed 1989
GWLP49 – 7 Seconds - Ourselves - licensed 1989
GWLP50 – Personal Effects – Mana Fiesta – licensed 1989
GWLP51 –
GWLP52 – T.S.O.L. - Beneath the Shadows - reissue 1989
GWLP53 – Ronnie Montrose – The Speed of Sound – 1989
GWLP101 – Motörhead – The Birthday Party - 1990
GWLP102 – Helix – Back for Another Taste – 1990
GWLP103 – Hawkwind – Space Bandits – 1990
GWLP104 – Hawkwind – Palace Springs – 1991
GWLP??? – Atomgod – History Re-Written  – 1991

Singles
GWR1 – Girlschool – "I'm the Leader of the Gang" / "Never Too Late" – 1986
GWR2 – Motörhead – "Deaf Forever" / "On the Road" (live) / 12" only: "Steal Your Face" (live) – 1986
GWR3 – Jon Mikl Thor – "Wild in the Streets" – 1986
GWR4 – Würzel – "Bess" / "Midnight in London" / "People Say I'm Crazy" / "E.S.P." – 1987
GWR5 –
GWR6 – Motörhead – "Eat the Rich" / "Cradle to the Grave" / 12" only: "Just 'Cos You Got the Power" – 1987
GWR7 – Batfish Boys – "Bomb Song" – 1987
GWR8 – Fastway – "A Fine Line" – 1988
GWR9 – The Kurts – "Bye Bye Baby" / "Prussian Stomp" – 1988
GWR10 –
GWR11 –
GWR12 – Tokyo – "Listen to Your Heartbeat" / "Satisfaction Guaranteed" / "Sixteen" – 1988
GWR13 –
GWR14 –
GWR15 – Motörhead – "Ace of Spades" (live) / "Dogs" (live) / "Traitor" (live) (Withdrawn) – 1988

See also
List of record labels

References

External links
 

Record labels established in 1986
Record labels disestablished in 1991
British independent record labels
Heavy metal record labels
Defunct record labels of the United Kingdom
1986 establishments in the United Kingdom